Kim Dae-jung (6 January 192418 August 2009) was a South Korean politician and activist who served as the eighth president of South Korea from 1998 to 2003.

He was a 2000 Nobel Peace Prize recipient for his work for democracy and human rights in South Korea and in East Asia in general, and for peace and reconciliation with North Korea and Japan. He is also the only Korean to have won the Nobel Prize to date. He was sometimes referred to as "the Nelson Mandela of Asia". Kim was the first opposition candidate to win the presidency.

Early life
Kim Dae-Jung was born on 6 January 1924, but he later edited his birth date to 3 December 1925 to avoid conscription under Japanese colonial rule. Kim was the second of seven children. His father, Kim Un-sik, was a farmer. Kim was a 12th generation descendant of Kim Ik-soo (김익수;金益壽) who served as Second Minister of the Board of War (병조참판;兵曹參判) and the civil minister (문신;文臣) who involved at the construction of Gwansanggam during Joseon period. Ik-soo is the grandson of Kim Young-jeong (김영정;金永貞) of Gimhae Kim clan, this makes him a distant relative of Kim Jong-pil. Kim was born in Sinan County, South Jeolla in what was then South Jeolla Province; the city is now in Jeollanam-do. Kim's family had moved to the nearby port city of Mokpo so that he could finish high school. He had to change his name to Toyota Taichū (豊田大中) because of the passing of the sōshi-kaimei ordinance.

Kim graduated from Mokpo Commercial Middle School in 1944, and worked as a clerk at a Japanese-managed shipping company. In 1945, Kim married his first wife Cha Yong-ae, going on to have two sons. After the Japanese defeat in World War II and the liberation of Korea, he was elected as the chairman of the company's management committee. In 1946, as newly-liberated Korea debated how to govern themselves for the first time in 40 years, he joined a nationalist organization with both pro-Communist and anti-Communist members but left after disagreements with the pro-communists. However, this left him open to red-baiting from his political opponents in his future political career. In 1947, he bought a ship and started his own shipping company and in 1948, Kim became the publisher of a Mokpo daily newspaper. As the Korean War started in June 1950, Kim was on a business trip in Seoul. As he returned to Mokpo on foot, he was captured by North Korean communists and was sentenced to be shot, though he managed to escape.

Early political career
Kim disposed his business, and entered politics in earnest from Mokpo in 1954 during the administration of Korea's first president, Syngman Rhee. From 1954 to 1960, he was defeated four times in elections. In 1956, he became the official party spokesman for the opposition Democratic Party led by former prime minister Chang Myon. Cha Yong-ae, Kim's wife, died unexpectedly in 1959, and Kim subsequently converted to Catholicism.

Although he was elected as a representative in a by-election for the National Assembly on 14 May 1961, Park Chung-hee seized power two days later in the May 16 coup, and later assumed dictatorial powers, voiding the elections. He was briefly arrested, before having his rights restored.

In 1962, Kim married Lee Hee-ho, a Christian activist, and had another son.

He was able to win a seat in the House in the subsequent elections in 1963 and 1967 and went on to become an eminent opposition leader.

1971 presidential campaign

After completing a master's course in economics at Kyung Hee University in 1970, he ran as opposition candidate for the country's presidential election in 1971, against President Park Chung-hee. President Park had removed term limits and was seeking to run for a third term. A very talented orator, Kim could command unwavering loyalty among his supporters. Kim won the nomination of the opposition party over Kim Young-sam, another pro-democracy politician.

Kim promised a welfare-oriented "mass economy" and also advocated easing tensions with North Korea, while predicting correctly that if Park was reelected, he would become a "generalissimo".

His staunchest support came from his home region of Jeolla, where he reliably garnered upwards of 95% of the popular vote, a record that has remained unsurpassed in South Korean politics. He performed strongly, achieving a strong showing of 45% of the vote against Park despite handicaps on his candidacy that were imposed by the ruling regime. With this strong showing, Park saw Kim as a threat to his rule.

1971 assassination attempt
One month later after the presidential election, while Kim was campaigning for legislative elections, a truck turned directly into the path of his car and seriously injured him and his two aides. Suffering a hip joint injury, he was left with a permanent limp for the rest of his life. It has been suspected that the collision was an assassination attempt by Park's regime. Shortly after, he left for Japan and began an exile movement as President Park launched a self-coup and introduced the dictatorial Yushin Constitution of 1972.

1973 kidnapping by KCIA

Kim was almost killed in August 1973, when he was kidnapped from a hotel in Tokyo by KCIA agents in response to his criticism of President Park's yushin program, which granted near-dictatorial powers. Years later, Kim reflected on these events during his 2000 Nobel Peace Prize lecture:

Philip Habib, the US ambassador in Seoul, had interceded for him with the South Korean government; the "airplane" referred to was a patrol plane from the Japan Maritime Self-Defense Force which was tracking the kidnappers.
 
Kim was returned to South Korea, then put under house arrest and banned from politics. He was imprisoned in 1976 for having participated in the proclamation of an anti-government manifesto and sentenced for five years in prison, which was reduced to house arrest in December 1978. During this period, he was designated a prisoner of conscience by Amnesty International.

In October 2007, the National Intelligence Service, successor to the KCIA, admitted that the KCIA carried out the plot. The NIS expressed its regret and had planned to kill and dump Kim into the sea. While the NIS panel said President Park "at least gave a passive approval", the panel added it could not prove Park directly ordered the kidnapping at the time.

Death sentence and exile
Kim had his political rights briefly restored in December 1979 by acting President Choi Kyu-hah after Park was assassinated, shortly before the Coup d'état of December Twelfth by Major General Chun Doo-hwan.

In the wake of the coup, Chun's regime began a new wave of repression, falsely accusing Kim of instigating the May 1980 popular uprising in Gwangju, his political stronghold, and arrested him on charges of sedition and conspiracy. He was sentenced to death in September 1980.

Pope John Paul II sent a letter to then-South Korean President Chun Doo-hwan on 11 December 1980, asking for clemency for Kim, a Catholic. American intelligence understood that Chun wanted Kim's execution to take place during the U.S. presidential transition between the outgoing president Jimmy Carter and president-elect Ronald Reagan. The outgoing Carter Administration, which had poor relations with the South Korean government, asked Reagan's incoming National Security Advisor Richard V. Allen to intervene. Allen, not wanting the Reagan Administration to be blamed for the execution, told Chun that Reagan was opposed to Kim's execution. Allen asked for Kim's sentence to be commuted, and Chun, who was eager to seek American acceptance of his rule following the 1980 coup, accepted in exchange for an invitation to be one of the first foreign leaders to visit the new Reagan Administration at the White House in February 1981. Kim's sentence was commuted to 20 years in prison.

In December 1982, he was given exile in the U.S. and temporarily settled in Boston and taught at Harvard University as a visiting professor to the Center for International Affairs. During his period abroad, he authored a number of opinion pieces in leading western newspapers that were sharply critical of the South Korean government. On 30 March 1983, Kim presented a speech on human rights and democracy at Emory University in Atlanta, Georgia and accepted an honorary Doctor of Laws degree by the institution.

Return to South Korea
Two years later, in February 1985, he returned to his homeland, accompanied by thirty-seven supporters, including Patricia M. Derian, former U.S. Assistant Secretary of State for Human Rights, two congressmen, and a number of other prominent Americans. Upon arrival in Seoul, many of his traveling companions were roughed up by the KCIA, while Kim and his wife, Lee Hee-ho were immediately put under house arrest.

Following the ruling government's drubbing in the 1985 South Korean legislative election, Chun lifted the ban on fourteen opposition politicians, but not for Kim Dae-jung.

Release, amnesty and 1987 presidential campaign

During the June Struggle of 1987 against Chun Doo-hwan, Chun succumbed to popular demand, releasing Kim Dae-jung and also allowing the country's first free presidential election. The June 29 Declaration by ex-General Roh Tae-woo, Chun Doo-hwan's handpicked successor, saw Kim given an amnesty and his political rights restored.

Kim and the other leading opposition figure, Kim Young-sam, initially promised to unite behind one candidate. However, disagreements between the two men over who was in a better position to win made Kim Dae-Jung split from the main opposition party, the Reunification Democratic Party, and formed the Peace Democratic Party to run for the presidency. As a result, the opposition vote was split, and Roh won with only 36.6% of the popular vote. Kim Young-sam received 28% and Kim Dae-jung 27% of the votes.

In July 2019, according to American Central Intelligence Agency (CIA) documents obtained by Hong Kong's South China Morning Post through a freedom of information request, the military-backed ruling forces drew up detailed plans to fix the election result in case Roh lost. The documents suggested that the government was prepared to crack down hard on any unrest following the vote, with an Intel briefing stating that an "open arrest order" had been prepared for Kim Dae-jung if he tried to "instigate a popular revolt against the election results". As Roh won the election, the plans were not implemented.

Kim was subsequently elected to the National Assembly in 1988 and 1992.

1992 presidential campaign and hiatus

In 1992, Kim made yet another failed bid for the presidency, this time solely against Kim Young-sam, who had merged the RDP with the ruling Democratic Justice Party to form the Democratic Liberal Party in 1990, which eventually became the Grand National Party. Kim then announced his retirement from politics.

Kim then departed for the United Kingdom to take a position at Clare Hall, Cambridge, as a visiting scholar.

Return to politics and 1997 election victory

However, in 1995, he announced his return to politics. Despite losing his comeback bid for a list seat in the 1996 National Assembly elections, he began his fourth quest for the presidency for the 1997 election.

Initially trailing heavily in the polls and seen by some as a perennial candidate, his situation became favorable when the public revolted against the incumbent conservative Kim Young-sam government in the wake of the nation's economic collapse in the Asian financial crisis just weeks before the election.

Forming an alliance with Kim Jong-pil who was previously prime minister under Park Chung-hee, he defeated Lee Hoi-chang, Kim Young-sam's designated successor, in the election held on 18 December 1997. His election victory at that time was the closest ever, where a split in the ruling conservative party led to separate candidacies of Lee Hoi-chang and Lee In-je, and both achieved 38.7% and 19.2% of the vote respectively, enabling Kim to win with only 40.3% of the popular vote or by a margin of 390,000 votes of 26 million over Lee Hoi-chang. Lee Hoi-chang was a former Supreme Court Justice and Prime Minister who had graduated at the top of his class from the Seoul National University School of Law. Lee was widely viewed as politically inexperienced, elitist, and his inept handling of charges that his sons had dodged the mandatory military service further damaged his campaign.

Kim, in contrast, had an outsider image which suited the anti-establishment mood and developed a strategy to use the media effectively in his campaign. In 1997, the "North Winds" scandal involved lawmakers of Lee's party, who met North Korean agents in Beijing, who agreed to instigate, in exchange for bribes, a skirmish on the DMZ right before the presidential election to try to cause a panic that would hamper Kim's campaign due to his dovish stand on North Korea. Lee's colleagues were later prosecuted.

Ex-presidents Park Chung-hee, Chun Doo-hwan, Roh Tae-woo, and Kim Young-sam originated from the Gyeongsang region, which became wealthier since 1945 partly because of the policies of Park, Chun, and Roh's regimes. Kim Dae-jung was the first president who came from the southwestern Jeolla region to serve a full term, an area that had been neglected and less developed partly because of the previous presidents' discriminatory policies.

Transition period as president-elect
Two days after the election, outgoing president Kim Young-sam and the president-elect Kim Dae-jung met and formed a joint 12-member Emergency Economic Committee (ECC), made up of six members each from the outgoing and incoming governments but effectively under the president-elect's control, serving as the de facto economic cabinet until Kim Dae-jung would assume office two months later on 25 February 1998. This meant that Kim effectively had taken charge of making economic decisions during this period even before he took office.

The president-elect's coalition and the majority Grand National Party of the outgoing president also agreed to convene a special session of the National Assembly to deal with a series of thirteen financial reform bills required under both the original IMF program and its 24 December revised deal. This transition period saw important financial reform legislation being passed into law, that had been stalled under the outgoing government. The president-elect cooperated with the outgoing government and ruling party to get legislative backing for several important reform measures. In particular, the delegation of substantial powers to the newly created Financial Supervisory Commission (FSC) greatly enhanced the government's powers to rein in the chaebols who were caught up in the crisis.

As president-elect, Kim Dae-jung also advised outgoing president Kim Young-sam to pardon two former presidents who were both imprisoned in 1996 for corruption, treason and insurrection, Chun Doo-hwan (who had Kim sentenced to death) and Roh Tae-woo (Chun's second-in-command), in the spirit of national unity.

Presidency (1998–2003) 

His swearing-in as the eighth president of South Korea on 25 February 1998 marked the first time in Korean history that the ruling party peacefully transferred power to a democratically-elected opposition winner. Kim took office amidst an economic crisis. In his inaugural address, President Kim characterized his administration as a "government of the people.”

Economic reforms and recovery
As a presidential candidate, Kim briefly questioned the conditions attached to the IMF loans and suggested that he might renegotiate it. However, upon his election, Kim quickly recognized the importance of the IMF agreement in restoring South Korea's economic health. Since then, he has implemented the most neoliberal policy among the major presidents of South Korea, leading to his nickname of "Neoliberal Revolutionist".

The first task of the Kim administration was restoring investor confidence. The administration held a series of intensive meetings with foreign creditors and quickly succeeded in rescheduling one-quarter of Korea's short-term liabilities.

He vigorously pushed economic reform and restructuring recommended by the International Monetary Fund, in the process significantly altering the landscape of South Korean economy. He commenced the gold-collecting campaign in South Korea to overcome the debt to the International Monetary Fund.

Immediately after taking office, the Kim Dae-jung government pushed for revision of the Outside Auditor Law to facilitate the adoption of consolidated financial statements in accordance with international standards, beginning in 1999.
Furthermore, as cross-guarantees allowed loss-making affiliates and subsidiaries with chaebol groups to continue to borrow from banks and drain financial resources from healthier firms, on 1 April 1998 the government prohibited any new intra-chaebol mutual payment guarantees and ordered the phasing-out of the existing guarantees by March 2000. Banks were directed
to negotiate financial restructuring agreements with chaebol groups to reduce any outstanding debts, including closing insolvent firms. With the government's commitment to introduce internationally accepted accounting practices, including independent external audits, full disclosure, and consolidated statements by conglomerates, the Kim administration helped to improve the transparency of chaebol corporate balance-sheets and governance and bring Korea's economy to greater integration with the global economy.

The government also adopted a proactive foreign investment policy. Scores of banks were closed, merged or taken over by the government, and surviving banks were recapitalized. The chaebol were pressured to lower their perilously high debt-equity ratios and establish greater corporate transparency and accountability. Foreign direct investment, under Kim, was viewed as vital to the financial and corporate reform process as a form of secure, stable and long-term form of investment, and also able to acquire new technologies and managerial practices.

Kim's administration did not shy away from using strong-arm tactics to bring about desired results. For example, when LG Group objected to Hyundai taking the controlling share and decided to pull out in the midst of merger negotiations, the newly created Financial Supervisory Commission (FSC) immediately called in LG Group's creditors to discuss punitive measures, including immediate suspension of credit and recall of existing loans and threatened to conduct a tax probe. In the end, LG Group agreed to the merger, relinquishing management control and selling its semiconductor business to Hyundai. Similarly, Samsung was encouraged to sell its automotive operations to Daewoo.

The reforms were modestly successful in getting the chaebols to change their ownership structure by separating ownership from management. Therefore, the largest changes made in this period were reforms in chaebol corporate governance through consolidated financial statements, independent external audits and reduction of intra-group mutual payment guarantees.

Chaebols also streamlined their operations by reducing their excessive leverage and consolidating their many operations in a few core competencies. Some also reduced their debt burden and increased their profitability. After the economy shrank by 5.8 percent in 1998, it grew 10.2 percent in 1999, marking an impressive recovery. South Korea repaid the IMF loan in August 2001, 3 years ahead of schedule.

Exports also recovered, led by exporting of semiconductors, automobiles, liquid crystal displays and mobile phones. Foreign investment during 1998 and 1999 exceeded that of the cumulative total for the previous 40 years. Foreign exchange reserves went from a perilously low $3.9 billion in December 1997 to $74.0 billion at the end of 1999, nearly double Korea's short-term external liabilities. The exchange rate strengthened quickly by 30% against the U.S. dollar, to the point of actually causing concern about eroding Korea's international competitiveness, and unemployment fell.

Despite worries of a second economic crisis in the wake of Daewoo's bankruptcy in July 1999 (after its chairman, Kim Woo-choong continued to raise the company's indebtedness and aggressively expand in spite of government restructuring and aid), the economic recovery remained on track. By also deciding not to bail out Daewoo, Kim's government conveyed a message to chaebols that no company was too big to fail.

The administration also amended the bankruptcy laws, simplifying legal proceedings for corporate rehabilitation and filing of bankruptcy and streamlining provisions for non-viable firms to exit markets.

Cyberinfrastructure
The Kim Dae-jung administration built up country-wide high-speed ICT infrastructure and fostered IT and venture businesses as the future source of growth. In his inaugural address, he expressed a vision for South Korea to advance "from the ranks of industrial societies…into the ranks of the knowledge and information-based societies where intangible knowledge and information will be the driving power for economic development". Today, South Korea is one of the most technologically developed countries in the world and has a well-connected cyberinfrastructure which began to be built and fostered under President Kim.

Welfare
Under the administration, expenditure on social protection was tripled. Outlays on social protection were increased from 2.6 trillion won (0.6 per cent of GDP) in 1997 to 9.1 trillion won (2.0 per cent of GDP) in 1999. The biggest policies that were introduced or expanded during Kim's term were:

 expansion of the unemployment insurance program by including all firms (originally, only firms with more than 30 employees were covered), shortening the contribution period required for eligibility, and extending the duration of unemployment benefits. Thus the eligible workforce was increased from 5.7 million workers at the beginning of 1998 to 8.7 million at the end of the year.
 introduction of a temporary public work program in May 1998, enrolling 76,000 workers. By January 1999, the program provided 437,000 jobs.
 temporary livelihood protection program covering 750,000 beneficiaries. It also introduced a means-tested noncontributory social pension for 600,000 elderly people.

Labour reform
Kim Dae-jung's government also enhanced labour market flexibility as a key goal of structural reforms.

Kim forged corporatist agreements between business, labour and government to get them to work together to resolve the country's financial woes. Kim's long history in the opposition, his pro-labour views and his overall populist, outsider credentials enabled him to get his mobilized and militant working-class voter base to make sacrifices to meet fiscal stabilization, while also asking businesses to make sacrifices at the same time.

After successful tripartite consultative negotiations between labor, business and government, the Labor Standards Act was amended by the National Assembly on 13 February 1998. Under the new accord, business promised to ensure transparency in its management and to take prudent measures when laying off its employees. Specifically, the law provided legal grounds for employment adjustment and permits layoffs only after a company has duly considered the interests of its workers. Labour, on the other hand, agreed to the implementation of flexible worker layoffs for restructuring, while pledging to work towards to enhancing productivity and cooperate with business on terms of wages and working hours. As for government, it committed itself to strengthening its support programs by providing vocational training and information on re-employment. New employment options such as temporary work, part-time employment and work at home were developed. To deal with the expected large-scale layoffs from the economic crisis and restructuring process, the government also pledged to strengthen and expand the coverage of unemployment insurance.

North Korea policy

His policy of engagement with North Korea has been termed the Sunshine Policy. He moved to begin détente with respect to the totalitarian government in North Korea, which culminated in a historic summit meeting in 2000 in Pyongyang with North Korean leader Kim Jong-il. This marked a critical juncture in inter-Korean relations. On 13 October 2000, he was awarded the Nobel Peace Prize for these efforts, and also in conjunction for his work for democracy and human rights in South Korea. A big consequence of these efforts is that on 15 September 2000, the Korean Unification Flag was carried into an Olympic Stadium during an Olympic opening ceremony for the first time. However, the historic event was tainted significantly by allegations that at least several hundred million dollars had been paid to North Korea, known as the cash-for-summit scandal. Hyundai transferred $500 million to the North just months before the summit, triggering criticism that the South Korean government paid for the summit. Hyundai claimed the money was a payment for exclusive business rights in electric power facilities, communication lines, an industrial park, cross-border roads and railway lines in North Korea. And in this regard, Park Jie-won was charged with violating domestic laws on foreign exchange trade and inter-Korean cooperation affairs while orchestrating covert money transfers by Hyundai to North Korea. Park played a pivotal role in arranging the first Inter-Korean summit. In May 2006, he was sentenced for three years in prison. Park was released in February 2007, and pardoned in December 2007. Also to persuade North Korea to attend the summit, several "unconverted long-term prisoners" kept by South Korea were released and returned to North Korea.

Relationship with former presidents
After Kim achieved the presidency and moved into the Blue House, there was uncertainty and considerable speculation about how he would deal with previous presidents: he had been sentenced to death under Chun Doo-hwan, Roh Tae-woo was Chun's number two and Kim Young-sam had been his political rival.

However, in December 1997 as president-elect, he advised outgoing president Kim Young-sam to pardon Chun and Roh who were imprisoned in 1996, in the spirit of national unity. Both Roh and Chun would attend Kim's inauguration ceremony in February 1998. Early in his term Kim invited Chun and Roh, both of whom attempted to have him killed, to the Blue House and refrained from seeking political vengeance. Subsequently, Kim organized gatherings with the former presidents to seek advice, an unprecedented move. After coming back from overseas visits, he invited them to the Blue House to explain the outcomes. During Kim's final days on his deathbed, the former presidents visited him and Chun met Lee Hee-ho, Kim's wife and former first lady, and recounted Kim's display of magnanimity towards him, even though he had once had him put on death row.

Political developments
When he entered office, he appointed Kim Jong-pil, formerly part of the Park Chung-hee dictatorship and Park's prime minister, as his first prime minister in return for Jong-pil endorsing his candidacy in a power-sharing agreement before the 1997 election. Kim's National Congress for New Politics, and Jong-pil's United Liberal Democrats (ULD) formed a coalition, but did not have a majority in the National Assembly. Instead, the now opposition Grand National Party (GNP) of Lee Hoi-chang held a majority. During the first six months in 1998, most of the 100 major reform measures failed to materialize due to the lack of the legislative support and partisan compromise. It was only in September 1998 that the ruling coalition secured a majority in the National Assembly by enticing a large number of opposition GNP lawmakers to defect. Up to 25 GNP deputies left the party to join the governing coalition, after arm-twisting tactics by the government by launching corruption, campaign finance and tax audit investigations on them.

The ULD and Kim Jong-pil subsequently left the coalition to join the opposition in January 2000, following disagreement with President Kim's North Korea policy and the failure of the president to uphold his deal with Jong-pil to introduce a cabinet-style government.

President Kim sought to remake his party into a national broad-based party instead of a base on regional appeal, and introduce multi-member parliamentary constituencies, with the ULD. However, Kim agreed with the GNP to implement a parallel voting system like in Japan, and the agreement collapsed amidst protests from civic groups. Thus the existing system was retained.

In 1999, the Furgate scandal damaged Kim Dae-jung and his party's reputation. Also, in spite of his background as a democratic reformer, Kim was accused of being vindictive towards political opponents and even journalists critical of his government, as seen when government agencies used strong-arm tactics against the opposition or reporters via politically motivated investigations along with accusations of spying on the opposition. Kim's administration included more individuals from Jeolla, which led to charges of reverse discrimination. Many citizens, in the middle of his term, also did not feel that the economic recovery benefitted them. Finally, conservatives accused Kim of being an appeaser towards North Korea with his Sunshine Policy.

These factors, led to National Congress, now renamed as the Millennium Democratic Party to suffer a setback as the party fell short behind the Grand National Party in the National Assembly during the 2000 South Korean legislative election. The decision to announce an inter-Korean summit 3 days before the election is said to have somewhat limited the governing party's losses as 79.6% of respondents in an opinion poll approved of the summit. Kim appointed Lee Han-dong, ULD president, as the new prime minister in a bid to mend fences and continue a governing majority against the GNP.

Later, the ULD left the coalition for good in September 2001. ULD members sided with the GNP to pass a vote of no-confidence by 148 to 119 votes against key Cabinet member, Unification Minister Lim Dong-won, who was in charge of the Kim government's "Sunshine Policy" with North Korea. President Kim effectively became a lame duck, and the political leverage that he had accumulated thanks to his summit diplomacy came to an abrupt end. Economic reform plans and engagement policies pursued by the administration simultaneously achieved mixed results until the end of his term one and a half years later.

Post-presidency
Kim exited at the end of his term on 24 February 2003 and was succeeded by Roh Moo-hyun.

Kim called for restraint against the North Koreans for detonating a nuclear weapon and defended the continued Sunshine Policy towards Pyongyang to defuse the crisis. He also received an honorary doctorate at the University of Portland on 17 April 2008 where he delivered his speech, "Challenge, Response, and God."

Illness and death

Kim died on 18 August 2009 at 13:43 KST, at Severance Hospital of Yonsei University in Seoul at age of 85 years old, three months after his successor Roh Moo-hyun. He was first admitted to hospital suffering from pneumonia on 13 July. The cause of death was cardiac arrest caused by multiple organ dysfunction syndrome. 
An interfaith state funeral was held for him on 23 August 2009 in front of the National Assembly Building, with a procession leading to the Seoul National Cemetery where he was interred according to Catholic traditions . near to former presidents Syngman Rhee and Park Chung-hee as well. He is the second person in South Korean history to be given a state funeral after Park Chung-hee. North Korea sent a delegation to his funeral.

Legacy
During his presidency, he introduced South Korea's contemporary welfare state, successfully shepherded the country's economic recovery, brought in a new era of competitive and transparent economy and fostered a greater role for South Korea in the world stage, including the FIFA World Cup, jointly hosted by South Korea and Japan in 2002. South Korea also became more democratic as a society, wired to the Internet, and based on a knowledge-intensive infrastructure. A presidential library at Yonsei University was built to preserve Kim's legacy, and there is a convention center named after him in the city of Gwangju, the Kim Dae-jung Convention Center.

A Gallup Korea poll in October 2021 showed Kim, Roh Moo-hyun, and Park Chung-hee as the most highly rated presidents of South Korean history in terms of leaving a positive legacy. However, compared to Roh and Park, Kim attracted an absolute majority of positive opinions amongst all age groups, with the highest support among citizens in the 40-49 age range.

See also

 Liberalism in South Korea
 Neoliberalism 
 Cash-for-summit scandal
 KT

References

External links

Kim Dae-jung Presidential Library

 
1924 births
2009 deaths
Amnesty International prisoners of conscience held by South Korea
Burials at Seoul National Cemetery
Converts to Roman Catholicism
Deaths from multiple organ failure
Democratic Party (South Korea, 2000) politicians
Fellows of Clare Hall, Cambridge
Kidnapped politicians
Kidnapped South Korean people
Honorary Knights Grand Cross of the Order of the Bath
Honorary Knights Grand Cross of the Order of St Michael and St George
Recipients of the Order of Merit of the Federal Republic of Germany
Nobel Peace Prize laureates
South Korean democracy activists
People from South Jeolla Province
Presidents of South Korea
Liberalism in South Korea
Neoliberalism
South Korean Nobel laureates
South Korean Roman Catholics
Political prisoners
20th-century Roman Catholics
21st-century Roman Catholics
South Korean prisoners sentenced to death
Recipients of the Olympic Order
Gimhae Kim clan
Members of the National Assembly (South Korea)
Politicians awarded knighthoods